FDCA may refer to:

 2,5-furandicarboxylic acid, oxidized furan derivative and important building block for range of polymers
  Federal Food, Drug, and Cosmetic Act, set of laws passed by Congress giving authority to the U.S. Food and Drug Administration
  Federation of Anarchist Communists, Federazione dei Comunisti Anarchici (FdCA), part of the international Anarchist Communist movement